Denys Filimonov (born January 4, 1971) is a Ukrainian former football forward. He was top scorer of the Ukrainian First League in 1992.

He is a father of Ukrainian footballer Artem Filimonov and Ukrainian blogger Maria Filimonova.

External links

Profile.
Profile

1971 births
Living people
Ukrainian footballers
Ukrainian Premier League players
Ukrainian First League players
Ukrainian Second League players
Soviet footballers
Ukrainian expatriate footballers
Expatriate footballers in Israel
Expatriate footballers in Kazakhstan
Ukrainian expatriate sportspeople in Israel
Ukrainian expatriate sportspeople in Kazakhstan
FC Krystal Kherson players
FC Dnipro players
FC Dnipro-2 Dnipropetrovsk players
FC Dnipro-3 Dnipropetrovsk players
FC Shakhtar Pavlohrad players
FC Kryvbas Kryvyi Rih players
NK Veres Rivne players
FC Bukovyna Chernivtsi players
Hapoel Rishon LeZion F.C. players
Liga Leumit players

Association football forwards